Leonard Harry Perroots, Sr., USAF  (April 24, 1933 – January 29, 2017) was Director of the Defense Intelligence Agency from October 1985 to December 1988. He retired January 1, 1989. In 1989, he was hired by Donald Mayes to become president of Vector Microwave Research Corporation, an enterprise performing tasks and dealings for the CIA and the U.S. military. While serving as assistant chief of staff for the U.S. Air Forces in Europe, he is credited with helping to avert a nuclear war with the Soviet Union during the Able Archer 83 war scare. Perroots died on January 29, 2017, at the age of 83 following a short illness.

Awards
Air Force Distinguished Service Medal
Legion of Merit with 2 Bronze Oak Leaf Clusters

References

External links 
 

1933 births
2017 deaths
Directors of the Defense Intelligence Agency
United States Air Force generals
Military personnel from Morgantown, West Virginia
West Virginia University alumni
War scare